Goa State Election Commission is an autonomous and statutory body constituted in Indian state of Goa for ensuring that elections are conducted in free, fair and unbiased way. Constitution of India with provisions as per Article 243K and 243 ZA and Article 324 ensures creation and safeguarding of the powers of State Election Commissions. Goa State Election Commission is responsible for conducting elections for Urban Local Bodies like Municipalities, Municipal Corporations, Panchayats and any other specified by Election Commission of India. Goa State Election Commissioner is appointed by Governor of Goa.

History 
The State Election Commission of Goa was constituted pursuant to the 73rd and 74th Amendments to the Constitution of India, by amending the Goa Municipalities Act, 1969 and the Goa Panchayat Raj Act, 1993. To ensure the autonomy of the position, the Goa state election commissioner cannot be removed from office except on the grounds and manner specified for judge of High Court. Geeta Sagar, IAS served as the first State Election Commissioner.

List of State Election Commissioners

|}

Powers and Responsibilities 

Goa States Election Commissioner is responsible for the following:

 Issue notification containing guidelines for conducting elections for Municipal Corporations in State.
 Conducting elections for Municipal Corporations in State.
 Issue notification containing guidelines for conducting elections for conducting elections for Municipal panchayats in State.
 Conducting elections for Municipal panchayats in State.
 Laying guidelines for persons eligible to contest in elections for Municipal Corporations in State.
 Conducting elections for Municipal panchayats in State.
 Model code of conduct are following in elections for local bodies.
 Updating Electoral rolls with new additions.
 Updating Electoral rolls with removals, if any.
 Declaration of results of elections held for Municipal Corporations in State.
 Declaration of results of elections held for Municipal panchayats in State.
 Ordering repoll if needed.

Composition 

Goa State Election Commission is a one-man commission consisting of Chief Election Commissioner. State Election Commissioners are independent persons not holding position or office in any Central or State Government organisations.

Shree W V Ramanamurthy, Retd I.A.S., is the Chief Election Commissioner of Goa. His period of service will be 5 years or attaining an age of 65 years whichever is earlier.

Constitutional Requirements 

Goa State Election Commission was formed after amendment of Constitution with 73rd and 74th declaration. State Election Commissions were formed as per Article 243K of the Constitution, similar to setting up of Election commission of India as per Article 324.

See also 

Election Commission of India.

References

External links 
 Official Website

Government of Goa
Elections in Goa
State agencies of Goa
State Election Commissioners of India